Javier Ángel Encinas Bardem (born 1 March 1969) is a Spanish actor. Known for his roles in blockbusters and foreign films, he won the Academy Award for Best Supporting Actor for his performance as the psychopathic assassin Anton Chigurh in the Coen Brothers' modern western drama film No Country for Old Men (2007). He received critical acclaim for his roles in films such as Jamón jamón (1992), Boca a boca (1995), Carne trémula (1997), Los lunes al sol (2002), and Mar adentro (2004). Bardem starred in Woody Allen's romantic drama Vicky Cristina Barcelona (2008), Sam Mendes's James Bond spy film Skyfall (2012), Terrence Malick's drama To the Wonder (2013), Darren Aronofsky's psychological horror film mother! (2017), Asghar Farhadi's mystery drama Everybody Knows (2018) and Denis Villeneuve's science fiction drama Dune (2021).

Bardem has been nominated for three additional Academy Awards; Julian Schnabel's Before Night Falls (2000), Alejandro González Iñárritu's Biutiful (2010), and Aaron Sorkin's Being the Ricardos (2021). Bardem is the first Spanish actor to be nominated for an Academy Award (Best Actor for Before Night Falls in 2001) as well as the first, and to date, only Spanish actor to win one (Best Supporting Actor for No Country for Old Men in 2008). He has received various other accolades, including two Screen Actors Guild Awards, a British Academy Film Award, a Golden Globe Award, five Goya Awards, two European Film Awards, two Volpi Cups for Best Actor at Venice Film Festival and a Cannes Film Festival Award for Best Actor.

Bardem has been married to actress Penélope Cruz since 2010. In January 2018, Bardem became the ambassador of Greenpeace for the protection of Antarctica.

Early life 
Bardem was born on 1 March 1969 in Las Palmas de Gran Canaria, in the Canary Islands, Spain. His mother, Pilar Bardem (1939–2021), was an actress, and his father, José Carlos Encinas Doussinague (1931–1995), was the son of a cattle rancher. According to Pilar's memoirs, José had a "capricious and violent will," and shot up the front door. He changed jobs more than 10 times, leading to evictions and the children going hungry. The two separated shortly after Javier's birth. His mother raised him and his elder siblings, Carlos and Mónica, alone (another sibling died shortly after birth), both of whom have also pursued an acting career. His father died of leukemia in 1995.

Bardem comes from a long line of filmmakers and actors dating back to the earliest days of Spanish cinema. He is a grandson of actors Rafael Bardem and Matilde Muñoz Sampedro (sister of actresses Mercedes and Guadalupe), and a nephew of screenwriter and director Juan Antonio Bardem. On the latter's side, he is a cousin of filmmaker Miguel Bardem. He comes from a political background, as his uncle Juan Antonio was imprisoned by Franco for his anti-fascist films. Bardem was brought up in the Roman Catholic faith by his grandmother.

As a child, he spent time at theatres and on film sets. At age six, he made his first film appearance, in Fernando Fernán Gómez's El Pícaro (The Scoundrel). He also played rugby for the junior Spanish National Team. Though he grew up in a family full of actors, Bardem did not see himself going into the family business, and painting was his preferred medium. He went on to study painting for four years at Madrid's Escuela de Artes y oficios. In need of money, he took acting jobs to support his painting but felt he was a bad painter and eventually abandoned it as a career.

In 1989, for the Spanish comedy show El Día Por Delante (The Day Ahead), he had to wear a Superman costume for a comedic sketch, a job that made him question whether he wanted to be an actor at all. Bardem also worked as a stripper (for one day) during his struggling acting career.

Career

1990s: Early work 
Bardem came to notice in a small role in his first major motion picture, The Ages of Lulu, when he was 21, in which he appeared along with his mother, Pilar Bardem. He also appeared in minor roles in Amo tu cama rica and High Heels. Bigas Luna, the director of Lulu, was sufficiently impressed to give him the leading male role in his next film, Jamón Jamón in 1992, in which Bardem played a would-be underwear model and bullfighter. The film, which also starred his eventual wife Penélope Cruz, was a major international success. Bardem featured in Sancho Gracia's Huidos, and starred in Bigas Luna's next film Golden Balls (1993).

Bardem's talent did not go unnoticed in the English-speaking world. In 1997, John Malkovich was the first to approach him, then a 27-year-old, for a role in English, but the Spanish actor turned down the offer because his English was still poor. His first English-speaking role came that same year, in with director Álex de la Iglesia's Perdita Durango, playing a santería-practicing bank robber.

2000s: Breakthrough and acclaim 
After starring in about two dozen films in his native country, he gained international recognition in Julian Schnabel's Before Night Falls in 2000, portraying Cuban poet Reinaldo Arenas. He received praise from his idol Al Pacino; the message Pacino left on Bardem's answering machine was something he considers one of the most beautiful gifts he has ever received. For that role, he received a nomination for the Academy Award for Best Actor, the first for a Spaniard. Immediately after, he turned down the role of Danny Witwer in Minority Report which eventually went to Colin Farrell. Instead, in 2002, Bardem starred in Malkovich's directorial debut, The Dancer Upstairs. Malkovich originally had Bardem in mind for the role of the detective's assistant, but the movie's time trying to find financing gave Bardem time to learn English and take on the lead role of the detective. "I will always be grateful to him because he really gave me my very first chance to work in English", Bardem has said of Malkovich.

Bardem won Best Actor at the Venice Film Festival for his role in Mar Adentro (2004), released in the United States as The Sea Inside, in which he portrayed the quadriplegic turned assisted suicide activist Ramón Sampedro. He made his Hollywood debut in a brief appearance as a crime lord who summons Tom Cruise's hitman to do the dirty work of dispatching witnesses in the crime drama Collateral. He stars in Miloš Forman's 2006 film Goya's Ghosts opposite Natalie Portman, where he plays a twisted monk during the Spanish Inquisition.

In 2007, Bardem acted in two film adaptations: the Coen brothers' No Country for Old Men, and the adaptation of the Colombian novel Love in the Time of Cholera with Giovanna Mezzogiorno by Gabriel García Márquez. In No Country for Old Men, he played a sociopathic assassin, Anton Chigurh. For that role, he became the first Spaniard to win an Academy Award for Best Supporting Actor. He won a Golden Globe Award and Screen Actors Guild (SAG) Award for Best Supporting Actor, the Critics' Choice Award for Best Supporting Actor, and the 2008 British Academy of Film and Television Arts (BAFTA) Award for Best Supporting Actor. 

Bardem's rendition of Chigurh's trademark word, "What business is it of yours where I'm from, friendo?" (in response to the convenience store owner's query, "Y'all gettin' any rain up your way?"), was named Top HollyWORDIE of 2007 in the annual survey by the Global Language Monitor. Chigurh was named No. 26 in Entertainment Weekly magazine's 2008 "50 Most Vile Villains in Movie History" list. Bardem's life's work was honored at the 2007 Gotham Awards, produced by Independent Feature Project.

Francis Ford Coppola singled out Bardem as an heir to, and even improvement on, Al Pacino, Jack Nicholson and Robert De Niro, referring to Bardem as ambitious, hungry, unwilling to rest on his laurels and always "excited to do something good." Bardem was attached to play the role of Tetro's mentor in Coppola's film Tetro, but the director felt the character should be female, so he was replaced by fellow Spaniard Carmen Maura. Bardem was originally cast to play fictional filmmaker Guido Contini in the film adaptation of the Broadway musical Nine but dropped out due to exhaustion. The part eventually went to Daniel Day-Lewis. He went on to star alongside Penélope Cruz and Scarlett Johansson in Woody Allen's Vicky Cristina Barcelona (2008) where he earned his fourth Golden Globe Award nomination.

2010s: Established career 

In 2010, he was awarded Best Actor at the Cannes Film Festival for his performance in Biutiful directed by Alejandro González Iñárritu, who specifically wrote the film with Bardem in mind. After being overlooked by the Globes and SAG, Bardem was the unexpected Oscar nominee on 25 January 2011, becoming the first all Spanish-language Best Actor nominee ever. He won his 5th Goya Award, this time for Best Actor in Biutiful, dedicating the win to his wife, Penélope Cruz, and newborn son. 

Around this same time, he was offered the lead role of "Gunslinger" Roland Deschain in Ron Howard's adaptation of Stephen King's Dark Tower novels. If he had signed, he would have starred in the TV series as well. Then Eon Productions offered him a role as villain Raoul Silva in the James Bond film Skyfall. With Universal deciding not to go forward with the ultra-ambitious adaptation of the 7-novel Stephen King series, and to end months of speculation, Bardem officially confirmed his role in Skyfall during an interview with Christiane Amanpour for ABC's Nightline.

Bardem received the 2,484th star of the Hollywood Walk of Fame on 8 November 2012. The star is located outside the El Capitan Theatre.

With his movie Sons of the Clouds: The Last Colony (2012), he demonstrated the suffering of the Sahrawi people in refugee camps. He publicly denounced the UN as unwilling to definitively resolve the human crisis there.

Bardem portrayed the main antagonist, Armando Salazar, in 2017's Pirates of the Caribbean: Dead Men Tell No Tales, the fifth film in the series. In September 2017, Bardem starred with Jennifer Lawrence, Michelle Pfeiffer, and Ed Harris in the horror film Mother! by director Darren Aronofsky, which focuses on a couple whose lives are disrupted by the arrival of unexpected guests. In 2018, Bardem once again appeared on screen alongside his spouse Penélope Cruz in Asghar Farhadi's feature film Everybody Knows.

2020s: Continued work 
In 2021, he portrayed Stilgar in Denis Villeneuve's science fiction drama Dune. That same year, he starred as Julio Blanco in Fernando León de Aranoa's workplace satire The Good Boss. His leading performance portraying a manipulative factory boss was considered among the finest of his career by critics, and clinched him a Goya Award. 

Also in 2021, he starred as Desi Arnaz, alongside Nicole Kidman as his on-screen wife Lucille Ball, in Amazon Studios' and Aaron Sorkin's Being the Ricardos. Despite unfavorable reactions in response to his casting as Arnaz, Bardem's portrayal received praise. For his performance, he received nominations for the Golden Globe Award for Best Actor – Motion Picture Drama and the Screen Actors Guild Award for Outstanding Performance by a Male Actor in a Leading Role, as well as his third Academy Award nomination for Best Actor, his fourth nomination overall.

Bardem was set to play Frankenstein's Monster in the upcoming remake of the Bride of Frankenstein, directed by Bill Condon. He appeared in the 2022 film Lyle, Lyle, Crocodile and is set to play King Triton in Disney's 2023 live-action/CGI movie, The Little Mermaid, directed by Rob Marshall. Bardem will also work once again with Kidman in the upcoming Apple TV+ and Skydance Animation film, Spellbound.

Personal life 

Bardem's native language is Spanish, and he is also fluent in English. He is a fan of heavy metal music, and credits the band AC/DC for helping him learn to speak English, in some respects. He is also a fan of Pearl Jam. Bardem does not drive, only getting behind the wheel for film roles, and he refers to himself as a "worker" or "entertainer," not an actor.

Although Bardem was raised as a Catholic, he is now agnostic. Following the legalization of same-sex marriage in Spain in 2005, Bardem stated that if he were gay, he would get married "right away tomorrow, just to fuck with the Church" (mañana mismo, sólo para joder a la Iglesia). He has later said that while he does not believe strongly in the supernatural, he does not deny it. "We are just this little tiny spot in the whole universe, so of course there must be other things, other people, other creatures, other lives and other dimensions. Sure, I believe in it". In the same interview, Bardem stated that he thinks science and belief "should go together".

Despite the villainous characters he has played throughout his acting career, Bardem has a self-confessed “hatred” of violence which stems from a fight in a nightclub in his early twenties which left him with a broken nose.

In May 2011 Bardem teamed up with The Enough Project's co-founder John Prendergast to raise awareness about conflict minerals in eastern Congo.

In 2007, Bardem began dating Penélope Cruz, his co-star in Vicky Cristina Barcelona. Bardem and Cruz have maintained a low public profile, refusing to discuss their personal lives. The couple married in July 2010 in The Bahamas.  They have two children: a son, named Leo Encinas Cruz, born on 23 January 2011, in Los Angeles; and a daughter, named Luna Encinas Cruz, born on 22 July 2013, in Madrid.

During the 2014 Israel–Gaza conflict, Bardem and Cruz signed an open letter denouncing Israel's actions as genocide.

In September 2018, at the Toronto Film Festival premiere of Everybody Knows {named after the song Everybody Knows done by John Legend}, Bardem told Ikon London Magazine about acting together with his spouse: "I find it very easy. In a sense that we play what we are supposed to play and then we go back to our daily life which is way more interesting than any fiction. And it is real."

In July 2019, Bardem signed a manifesto urging PSOE and Podemos parties to reach an agreement to form government after the April 2019 elections in Spain.

In Madrid, in November 2019 during March for Climate, Bardem gave a speech on stage where he called both the mayor of Madrid José Luis Martínez-Almeida and the US president "stupid". He later apologized, declaring that "the insult illegitimates any speech and conversation."

Filmography

Awards and nominations 

Over his career, he has been recognized by the Academy of Motion Picture Arts and Sciences for the following performances:

73rd Academy Awards: Best Actor in a Leading Role, nomination, for Before Night Falls (2000)
80th Academy Awards: Best Actor in a  Supporting Role, win, No Country for Old Men (2008)
83rd Academy Awards: Best Actor in a Leading Role, nomination, Biutiful (2010)
94th Academy Awards: Best Actor in a Leading Role, nomination, Being the Ricardos (2021)

See also 
 List of Spanish Academy Award winners and nominees
 List of actors with Academy Award nominations
 List of actors with Hollywood Walk of Fame motion picture stars

References

External links 

 
 

1969 births
Living people
20th-century Spanish male actors
21st-century Spanish male actors
Javier
Best Actor Goya Award winners
Best Supporting Actor Academy Award winners
Best Supporting Actor BAFTA Award winners
Best Supporting Actor Goya Award winners
Best Supporting Actor Golden Globe (film) winners
Cannes Film Festival Award for Best Actor winners
European Film Award for Best Actor winners
Former Roman Catholics
Independent Spirit Award for Best Male Lead winners
Male actors from the Canary Islands
Outstanding Performance by a Cast in a Motion Picture Screen Actors Guild Award winners
Outstanding Performance by a Male Actor in a Supporting Role Screen Actors Guild Award winners
People from Las Palmas
Spanish agnostics
Spanish expatriates in the United States
Spanish male child actors
Spanish male film actors
Spanish male television actors
Spanish socialists
Volpi Cup for Best Actor winners